The 2020 WAFU Zone A Women's Cup was the maiden edition of the international women's football event for teams from Zone A of the West African Football Union (WAFU). The competition was hosted by Sierra Leone at 2 match venues.7 team out of  8 had participate in this edition, only Mauritania did not participate. Senegal win Mali in the final, Agueissa Diarra was the top scorer with 6 goals.

Draw
The draw was held on 9 February in Sierra Leone. eight of WAFU's Zone A members entered a team (Mauritania did not enter).

Squad

Group stage

Group A

Group B

Knockout stage

Semifinals

Third place

Final

Top scorers

Links

References

West African Football Union competitions